The Beck Theatre is a 600-seat theatre in Hayes, in the London Borough of Hillingdon. It was built in 1977 at a cost of £2.5 million.

Type
The Beck is a community theatre, offering one-night concerts, drama, comedy, dance, musicals, children's shows, films, opera, pantomime, and a children's summer project.

History
The Beck Theatre was built in 1977 by Hillingdon Borough Council, with a bequest from Councillor Alfred Beck. It was purpose-built as a community-focused theatre, and is set in a parkland aspect adjoining a botanical garden (the Norman Leddy Memorial Gardens).

The Beck was one of forty buildings considered for the Royal Institute of British Architects London region award in 1978, and in 2004 won an Access Award from Hillingdon Council for its resources for disabled and elderly people.

A fund shortage threatened the theatre's future in 1984, when it was saved by a local petition. It was taken over in 1986 by impresario Charles Vance. The management contract passed then to Hetherington Seelig, followed by Apollo Leisure in 1992 (later bought out by Clear Channel Entertainment). In 2006, the Beck reverted to Hetherington Seelig in a partnership with Qdos Entertainment called HQ Theatres, which continues to run the theatre on behalf of the local council.

In June 1991, the theatre was the scene of an attempted IRA bombing, before a performance by the Blues and Royals band.

from June 1998 until July 1999 New York Times #1 bestseller Tony Lee worked at the theatre as their Marketing Manager.

Artists
The following is a selective list of artists to have performed at the Beck:

 Ian Anderson of Jethro Tull
 Colin Blunstone & Rod Argent (15 Jun 2000)
 Marcus Brigstocke
 Brotherhood of Man (7 Sep 2012)
 Errol Brown of Hot Chocolate
 Roy 'Chubby' Brown
 Jimmy Carr
 Frank Carson
 Chas & Dave
 Jim Davidson
 Alan Davies
 Jack Dee
 Donovan (10 Jun 2005)
 Fairport Convention
 Georgie Fame (20 Nov 2003)
 Foster & Allen
 The Fureys & Davey Arthur
 Billy Fury (who gave his final concert here in 1982)
 Hinge and Bracket (5 Apr 1999)
 The Hollies
 Roy Hudd
 Jethro
 Jimmy Jones
 Danny La Rue (31 May 1999)
 Sean Lock
 Dennis Locorriere of Dr Hook (12 Mar 1999)
 Joe Longthorne
 Lee Mack
 Bernard Manning
 Les McKeown's Bay City Rollers (14 Mar 2010)
 Jacqui McShee's Pentangle (1 Nov 2000)
 Ralph McTell (24 Oct 2000)
 Paul Merton
 The Osmonds (22 Sep 2014)
 Gilbert O'Sullivan (13 Jun 1998)
 Mickey Rooney (26 Sep 2007)
 Showaddywaddy
 Frank Skinner
 Freddie Starr
 Steeleye Span
 Suggs of Madness
 Bobby Vee (24 Nov 2005)
 Barbara Windsor
 Bill Wyman's Rhythm Kings (25 May 2000)
 Marshall Hain (8 October 1978)

Transport

Buses
The 90, 195, 427, 607, H98 and U7 buses all stop at the Beck Theatre. Alight at the traffic lights at the junction of Uxbridge Road and Grange Road.

Train
The 90, 195 and H98 buses connect Hayes and Harlington Station and the Beck Theatre.

Tube
Uxbridge is the closest London Underground station. The 427, 607 and U7 buses connect Uxbridge station and the Beck Theatre.

External links
 Official Website
 Pantomimes at the Beck Theatre, 1981 to the present
 HQ Theatres entry
 Theatres Trust entry Theatres Trust

References

Theatres in the London Borough of Hillingdon
Theatres completed in 1977
1977 establishments in England